The  is a Japanese Go competition.

Outline 
The Women's Kisei is sponsored by NTT DoCoMo, and uses a hayago format, of 30 seconds per move and a 10x1 minute byo-yomi, unlike the Kisei, which uses an eight-hour thinking time format. The winner's purse is 5,000,000 Yen ($38,000).

Past winners

Winners in chronological order:

Winners by number of titles:

References

External links
 Nihon Ki-in archive (in Japanese)

Kisei (Go)